EcoWin was a provider of worldwide economic and financial market data until it was taken over by Reuters Group in 2005. It was based in Gothenburg, Sweden, where it was founded in 1994. It had offices in London, Paris, New York City and Gdańsk.

In November 2005, EcoWin AB was acquired by Reuters Group, later Thomson Reuters. The company's main product — time series analysis and charting toolset EcoWin Pro — was marketed until 2013. As of September 2015 EcoWin Pro is being phased out. Thomson Reuters encouraged users to migrate to the Datastream and Eikon platforms.

References

External links
 Official site

Thomson Reuters
Research and analysis firms of Sweden
Defunct research and analysis firms